Gounou-Gaya Airport  is a public use airport located near Gounou-Gaya, Mayo-Kebbi Est, Chad.

See also
List of airports in Chad

References

External links 
 Airport record for Gounou-Gaya Airport at Landings.com

Airports in Chad
Mayo-Kebbi Est Region